SS Stockport was a passenger and cargo vessel built for the Great Central Railway in 1912. During the Second World War she served as a convoy rescue ship until a U-boat sank her in February 1943.

History

The ship was built by Earle's Shipbuilding of Hull and launched in 1912. In 1923 she passed into the ownership of the London and North Eastern Railway, and in 1935 to the Associated Humber Lines.

On 11 August 1937 she was in collision with the Hull steam trawler Lady Beryl in the Humber off Immingham in thick fog. Both vessels were damaged but not below the water line.

Her convoy rescue service began on 22 October 1941. She rescued 413 survivors from sunken ships while sailing with sixteen convoys, including convoy SC-107.

After  torpedoed and damaged Empire Trader, Stockport rescued all 106 crew men before  scuttled Empire Trader following orders received from the Admiralty. However, Stockport had itself now fallen.

She is commemorated every February in a parade and commemoration service organised by Hazel Grove Royal Naval Association.

References

1911 ships
Steamships of the United Kingdom
Ships built on the Humber
Ships of the London and North Eastern Railway
Ships of the Great Central Railway
Ships of Associated Humber Lines
Maritime incidents in February 1943
Ships sunk by German submarines in World War II